Universal Bibliographic Control (UBC) was a concept championed by the International Federation of Library Associations and Institutions (IFLA). Under the theoretical UBC, any document would only be cataloged once in its country of origin, and that record would then be available for the use of any library in the world.

During the 1970s, IFLA established an office for Universal Bibliographic Control.

Dunsire, Hillman, Phipps, and Willer have suggested that Semantic Web technologies, including BIBFRAME may allow UBC.

See also
UNIMARC
Universal Decimal Classification
Virtual International Authority File
WorldCat

References

Library cataloging and classification
Library cooperation